Episcea sancta is a moth of the family Erebidae. It was described by Warren in 1901. It is found in Brazil.

References

Episcea
Moths described in 1901